La Estrella (English: "The Star"), also known as Ancón, is a station on line A of the Medellín Metro going south. It is located in the La Estrella municipality of Colombia. It was inaugurated on September 17, 2012 as part of the extension of the line from Itagüí in a ceremony attended by the current president of Colombia, Juan Manuel Santos; Governor of Antioquia, Sergio Fajardo; and Medellin Mayor Aníbal Gaviria.

This station was designed as part of the larger project "Centrality South" for the metropolitan area to meet the needs of the inhabitants of southern Valle de Aburrá. Currently, it is the only semi-underground station.

References

External links
 Official site of Medellín Metro 

Medellín Metro stations
Railway stations opened in 2012
2012 establishments in Colombia